Lipnița is a commune in Constanța County, Northern Dobruja, Romania.

The commune includes seven villages:
 Lipnița
 Canlia
 Carvăn (historical names: Kervan) - established in 1968 from the merger of Carvănu Mare (historical name:Carvan de Sus) and  Carvănu Mic (historical name: Carvan de Jos)
 Coșlugea
 Cuiugiuc
 Goruni (historical name: Velichioi until 1968)
 Izvoarele (historical name: Pârjoaia until 1968)

In October 2017, a border crossing was inaugurated in Lipnița, linking it with the neighbouring commune of Kaynardzha in Bulgaria.

Demographics
At the 2011 census, Lipnița had 2,764 Romanians (87.2%), 39 Roma (1.2%), 210 Turks (6.6%).

References

Communes in Constanța County
Localities in Northern Dobruja
Place names of Slavic origin in Romania
Bulgaria–Romania border crossings